Clément Boyer (born 27 July 1994) is a French professional rugby league footballer who plays as a  or as a  forward for AS Carcassonne. He spent most of his career at Toulouse Olympique in the Betfred Championship and Elite 1. He also had brief spells with Halifax Panthers and Albi.

Background
Boyer was born in Tarn, France.

Club career

Toulouse Olympique
Boyer made his Toulouse debut on 14 October 2012 in a 42-16 win at Villeneuve in Elite 1. He went on to make 163 appearances for Toulouse for both the first team (in England and France) and for the Toulouse Olympique Broncos in Elite 1. He scored 24 tries. His last appearance came on 15 May 2021 in the 20-12 defeat at home to AS Carcassonne in Elite 1.

In 2016, he was nominated for the Kingstone Press League 1 Young Player of the Year.

On 20 August 2020,Toulouse announced that Boyer's contract with the first team would not be renewed. However, it was not the end of the TO connection for Boyer, as he joined the reserve side Toulouse Olympique Broncos in Elite 1 for 2020/21 and made one more appearance for the first team in 2021, coming off the bench in the 44-34 win at Halifax on 25 April.

Halifax
Boyer joined Halifax from Toulouse in July 2015 and played two matches for them in the 2015 RFL Championship before returning to France.

Albi
He played three matches for Albi at the start of the 2015/16 season.

Carcassonne
Boyer joined Carcassonne for the 2021/22 season upon his release from Toulouse. In November 2021, he announced that he had engaged an Australian agent to try and secure him a club in the Australian lower leagues for 2022.

International career
Boyer is a French international.

References

External links
Toulouse Olympique XIII profile
Toulouse Olympique profile
2017 RLWC profile

1994 births
Living people
AS Carcassonne players
France national rugby league team players
French rugby league players
Halifax R.L.F.C. players
Racing Club Albi XIII players
Rugby league props
Rugby league second-rows
Toulouse Olympique Broncos players
Toulouse Olympique players